Jason Jerrod Bourgeois (born January 4, 1982) is an American former professional baseball outfielder. He played eight seasons in Major League Baseball (MLB), with two seasons each for the Houston Astros and the Cincinnati Reds. Bourgeois would play all outfield positions and second base in MLB.

Amateur career
Born and raised in Houston, Texas, Bourgeois was teammates with fellow MLB outfielders Carl Crawford and Michael Bourn on a little league team that won the state championship. Bourgeois would later go on to attend Forest Brook High School. During his senior year at Forest Brook, Bourgeois hit .553 with four home runs, 43 RBI, and 24 stolen bases.

Professional career

Texas Rangers
Bourgeois was drafted as a shortstop in the second round (56th overall) of the 2000 Major League Baseball draft by the Texas Rangers. He played in the Rangers minor league system until 2004, reaching as high as Double-A.

Atlanta Braves
On March 23, 2005, the Atlanta Braves claimed Bourgeois off waivers from the Rangers. He spent the entire season with the Triple-A Richmond Braves, batting .240 with two home runs and 16 RBI in 119 games.

Seattle Mariners
The Seattle Mariners selected Bourgeois in the Rule 5 Draft on December 8, 2005. In 107 games with the Double-A San Antonio Missions, he batted .277 with four home runs and 38 RBI while stealing 23 bases in 30 attempts. He would become a minor league free agent after the season.

Chicago White Sox
On December 19, 2006, Bourgeois signed a contract with the Chicago White Sox. He was recalled by the White Sox on September 6, and made his major league debut on September 9 against the Toronto Blue Jays as a pinch runner. Bourgeois is the last player to get his first major league hit at the original Yankee Stadium.

Milwaukee Brewers
On November 24, 2008, the Milwaukee Brewers signed Bourgeois to a minor league deal with an invitation to spring training. He was assigned to play for with the Triple-A Nashville Sounds of the Pacific Coast League. He would hit .189/.250/.270 in 24 games for Milwaukee in 2009, but did hit his first big league home run off of the Pittsburgh Pirates' Zach Duke on August 28.

On August 12, 2009, he was called to play for the Brewers to replace Bill Hall, who was designated for assignment. This would be the first of two times that Bourgeois would replace Bill Hall on a Major League roster. The second came on June 4, 2011, when the Houston Astros released Hall after activating Bourgeois from the disabled list.

Houston Astros
Bourgeois was claimed off waivers by the Houston Astros on October 26, 2009.

On January 20, 2010, Bourgeois, who was designated for assignment by the Astros, accepted his assignment to Triple A Round Rock after clearing waivers.

On June 20, 2010, Bourgeois, Jason Castro and Chris Johnson were added to the major league roster and Casey Daigle, Cory Sullivan and Kevin Cash were designated for assignment. Bourgeois played in 69 games for the Astros that year, batting .220 with 3 RBI. He also made twelve starts in September and October after starting center fielder Michael Bourn was injured.

On April 30, 2011, Bourgeois earned his first career walk-off win with a single to left field in the bottom of the ninth inning scoring Bill Hall (who pinch ran for Brett Wallace after he reached base on a walk earlier that inning) from second base to lead the Astros to a 2–1 victory over the Milwaukee Brewers. Bourgeois had the other run in that game. Overall, it was a breakout game for Bourgeois, as he had a game-high three hits (two singles and a double). He also had two stolen bases (second and third consecutively) in the first inning, and would later come home and score a run that inning on a Hunter Pence RBI single. Later that year on July 31, he would hit his second major league home run off of Chris Narveson and his former team, the Brewers.

Kansas City Royals
On March 20, 2012, Bourgeois was traded to the Kansas City Royals along with Humberto Quintero for minor leaguer Kevin Chapman and a player to be named later. He appeared in 30 games for the Royals during the 2012 season, batting .258 with 5 RBI and five stolen bases. Most of his season was spent with the Triple A affiliate Omaha Storm Chasers, where he had a .243 batting average with three home runs, 8 RBI and seven stolen bases in 60 games. On November 2, 2012, the Royals designated Bourgeois for assignment. After clearing waivers, he elected to become a free agent on November 12.

Tampa Bay Rays
On December 5, 2012, the Tampa Bay Rays signed Bourgeois to a minor league contract, with no guaranteed invite to Spring Training. Bourgeois played most of his season with the Triple-A Durham Bulls, batting .290 with two home runs and 61 RBI in 90 games. On August 14, playing only his sixth game for the Rays after being called up, Bourgeois hit a walk-off RBI single to help the Rays defeat the Seattle Mariners. He was designated for assignment on August 23, 2013.

Cincinnati Reds
On November 5, 2013, Bourgeois signed with the Cincinnati Reds with an invite to Spring Training. On September 1, 2014, the Reds selected Bourgeois' contract from the Triple-A Louisville Bats, and he hit .242/.265/.303 in 18 games. Bourgeois would take on a larger role for Cincinnati during the 2015 season, hitting .240/.294/.332 with three home runs and 14 RBI in 68 games.

Arizona Diamondbacks
On December 23, 2015, Bourgeois signed a minor league deal with the Arizona Diamondbacks. He began the season with the Triple-A Reno Aces, batting .356 with 9 RBI in 33 games.

Chicago White Sox
Bourgeois was traded to the Chicago White Sox for cash considerations on May 16, 2016. He was assigned to the Triple-A Charlotte Knights, where he hit .273 with three home runs and 38 RBI in 89 games to finish the season.

On January 17, 2017, Bourgeois was re-signed by the White Sox to a minor league deal. He elected free agency on November 6, 2017.

Tigres de Quintana Roo
On December 4, 2017, Bourgeois signed with the Tigres de Quintana Roo of the Mexican Baseball League. He was released on July 15, 2018.

Coaching career
On January 16, 2019, he was announced as an assistant coach for the Great Lakes Loons in the Los Angeles Dodgers farm system.

Personal life
Bourgeois is married to American singer and Sony ATV songwriter Coline Creuzot. The couple had their first child in 2015.

References

External links

1982 births
Living people
African-American baseball coaches
African-American baseball players
Águilas de Mexicali players
American expatriate baseball players in Mexico
Baseball coaches from Texas
Baseball players from Houston
Birmingham Barons players
Cañeros de Los Mochis players
Charlotte Rangers players
Cincinnati Reds players
Charlotte Knights players
Chicago White Sox players
Corpus Christi Hooks players
Durham Bulls players
Frisco RoughRiders players
Gulf Coast Astros players
Gulf Coast Rangers players
Houston Astros players
Kansas City Royals players
Louisville Bats players
Major League Baseball second basemen
Major League Baseball outfielders
Mexican League baseball center fielders
Mexican League baseball right fielders
Milwaukee Brewers players
Minor league baseball coaches
Naranjeros de Hermosillo players
Nashville Sounds players
Oklahoma City RedHawks players
Omaha Storm Chasers players
Peoria Saguaros players
Pulaski Rangers players
Reno Aces players
Richmond Braves players
Round Rock Express players
San Antonio Missions players
Savannah Sand Gnats players
Stockton Ports players
Tampa Bay Rays players
Tigres de Quintana Roo players
Venados de Mazatlán players
Forest Brook High School alumni
21st-century African-American sportspeople
20th-century African-American people